Grezino is a rural locality (a village) in Vtorovskoye Rural Settlement, Kameshkovsky District, Vladimir Oblast, Russia. The population was 6 as of 2010.

Geography 
Grezino is located 41 km southwest of Kameshkovo (the district's administrative centre) by road. Orgtrud is the nearest rural locality.

References 

Rural localities in Kameshkovsky District